The Light-Bearer is a novel by Sam Nicholson published in 1980.

Plot summary
The Light-Bearer is a novel in which Prince Zeid seeks to aid the Terrans who are helping the natives of his planet modernize.

Reception
Greg Costikyan reviewed The Light-Bearer in Ares Magazine #5 and commented that "The Light Bearer is light sf/fantasy adventure, and very cleanly written; it reminds one of nothing so much as Sprague DeCamp's Krishna series."

Reviews
Review by Douglas E. Winter (1980) in Fantasy Newsletter, No. 28 September 1980
Review by Tom Easton (1980) in Analog Science Fiction/Science Fact, November 1980

References

1980 American novels
American science fiction novels